Imola (or ) is a city and comune in the Metropolitan City of Bologna, located on the river Santerno, in the Emilia-Romagna region of northern Italy. The city is traditionally considered the western entrance to the historical region Romagna.

The city is best-known as the home of the Autodromo Enzo e Dino Ferrari which hosts the Formula One Emilia Romagna Grand Prix and formerly hosted the San Marino Grand Prix (the race was named after the independent nation of San Marino which is around 100 km to the south), and the deaths of Formula One drivers Ayrton Senna and Roland Ratzenberger at the circuit during the 1994 San Marino Grand Prix. The death of Senna (three-times world champion) was an event that shocked the sporting world and led to heightened Formula One safety standards.

History 
The city was anciently called Forum Cornelii, after the Roman dictator L. Cornelius Sulla, who founded it about 82 BC. The city was an agricultural and trading centre, famous for its ceramics.

The name Imola was first used in the 7th century by the Lombards, who applied it to the fortress (the present Castellaccio, the construction of which is attributed to the Lombard Clefi), whence the name passed to the city itself. According to Paul the Deacon, Imola was in 412 the scene of the marriage of Ataulf, King of the Visigoths, to Galla Placidia, daughter of Emperor Theodosius the Great. In the Gothic War (535–552), and after the Lombard invasion, it was held alternately by the Byzantines and barbarians.

With the exarchate of Ravenna, it passed under papal authority. In the ninth century, Fausto Alidosi defended the city against the Saracens and Hungarians. In the tenth century, Troilo Nordiglio acquired great power. This and the following centuries witnessed incessant wars against the Ravennatese, the Faentines and the Bolognese, as well as the internecine struggles of the Castrimolesi (from Castro Imolese, "castle of Imola") and the Sancassianesi (from San Cassiano). Amid these conflicts, the republican constitution of the city was created. In the contest between pope and emperor, Imola was generally Ghibelline, though it often returned to the popes (e.g. in 1248). Several times, powerful lords attempted to obtain the mastery of the city (Alidosi, 1292; Maghinardo Pagano, 1295). Pope Benedict XII turned the city and its territory over to Lippo II Alidosi with the title of pontifical vicar, the power remaining in the family Alidosi until 1424, when the condottiero Angelo della Pergola, "capitano" for Filippo Maria Visconti, gained the supremacy (see also Wars in Lombardy). In 1426 the city was restored to the Holy See, and the legate (later Cardinal) Capranica inaugurated a new regime in public affairs.

Various condottieri later ruled in the city, such as the Visconti; several landmark fortresses remain from this period. In 1434, 1438, and 1470, Imola was conferred on the Sforza, who had become dukes of Milan (Lombardy). It was again brought under papal authority when it was bestowed as dowry on Caterina Sforza, the bride of Girolamo Riario, nephew of Pope Sixtus IV. Riario was invested with the Principality of Forlì and Imola. This proved advantageous to Imola, which was embellished with beautiful palaces and works of art (e.g. in the cathedral, the tomb of Girolamo, murdered in 1488 by conspirators of Forli). The rule of the Riarii, however, was brief, as Pope Alexander VI deprived the son of Girolamo, Ottaviano, of power, and on 25 November 1499, the city surrendered to Cesare Borgia. After his death, two factions, that of Galeazzo Riario and that of the Church, competed for control of the city. The ecclesiastical party was victorious, and in 1504 Imola submitted to Pope Julius II. The last trace of these contests was a bitter enmity between the Vaini and Sassatelli families.

In 1797, the revolutionary French forces established a provisional government at Imola. In 1799, it was occupied by the Austrians, and in 1800, it was united to the Cisalpine Republic. After that, it shared the fortunes of the Romagna region.

Sport 

The main sport venue in Imola is the Imola Circuit, which was opened in the 1950s and holds many racing events every year. The circuit has hosted Formula 1 in the 1980 Italian Grand Prix, from 1981 to 2006 as part of the San Marino Grand Prix and from 2020 as part of the Emilia Romagna Grand Prix. The city has dedicated multiple memorials and public spaces to Ayrton Senna and Roland Ratzenberger, who lost their lives in the circuit during the 1994 San Marino Grand Prix.

The city has hosted multiple international and national cycling events like the 1968 UCI Road World Championships, 2020 UCI Road World Championships and 2021 Italian National Road Race Championships.

The city has two professional basket teams, Virtus Imola (born in 1936) and Andrea Costa Imola (born in 1967). Both of them  play in the "PalaRuggi" sports hall.

The city's professional soccer team, Imolese Calcio 1919, plays in a stadium located inside the Circuit, "Stadio Romeo Galli".

The city has two swimming pools and from 2020 until 2024 will host the italian federal breaststroke swimming training center.

Main sights 
Imola Circuit (Imola Circuit)
Rocca Sforzesca (Sforza Castle), built under the reign of Girolamo Riario and Caterina Sforza. Now houses a Cinema d'Estate which shows films in July and August. It also is the location of the world-famous International Piano Academy "Incontri col Maestro", founded in 1989 by Franco Scala.
Palazzo Tozzoni (Tozzoni's Mansion), built between 1726 and 1738 by the architect Domenico Trifogli, civic art museum since 1981.
Duomo (cathedral), dedicated to San Cassiano. Erected from 1187 to 1271, it was repeatedly restored in the following centuries, until a large renovation was held in 1765–1781. The façade dates to 1850.
Convento dell'Osservanza, including the church of San Michele from 1472, to which later a convent with two cloisters was added. It houses a sarcophagus of Lucrezia Landriani (1496), mother of Caterina Sforza. The interior has a nave and an aisles, finished in 1942; it houses a fresco attributed to Guidaccio da Imola (1472). In the apse is a Byzantine-style crucifix from the 15th century. The first cloister, dating to 1590, had originally 35 frescoes of stories of St. Francis, 15 of which went lost. In the garden annexed to the church is a precious Pietà in terracotta of late-15th century Bolognese or Faenza school.
Santuario della Beata Vergine del Piratello and Cimitero del Piratello. On 27 March 1483 a pilgrim named Stefano Manganelli witnessed a miracle at Piratello in which a vision of the Madonna requested that the people of Imola build her a shrine, leading to the establishment of a monastery and the Santuario della Beata Vergine. The monastery was dissolved during the Napoleonic suppressions of the early 1800s The Cimitero del Piratello was authorized in 1817 and opened several years later, occupying the former convent cloisters adjacent to the Santuario (designated a Basilica by Pope Pius XII in 1954). The cemetery was further developed in 1916 with the addition of the Campo Monumentale.

Other buildings include the Farsetti and the Communal palaces. In the latter is a fresco representing Clement VII and Charles V (1535) passing through the city. The public library was established in 1747 by the Conventual Padre Setti. In the 16th century, the Accademia degli Industriosi flourished.

Green areas
The Acque Minerali Park, located next to Santerno river, on the hills of the city. The park was created in the beginning of the 20th century; the discovery of the mineral water occurred in 1830 
The Tozzoni Park, located on a big hilly area on the side of the city; it became a public area in 1978. The Tozzoni family bought the park in 1882 and used it as a hunting reserve, naming it "Parco del Monte" (Italian: "Park of the Mountain").

People 
 Pope Honorius II (1124–1130), born Lamberto Scannabecchi
 Antonio Maria Valsalva, anatomist who founded the anatomy and physiology of the ear
 Benvenuto Rambaldi da Imola, a lecturer on Dante at the University of Bologna in the 14th century
 Gedaliah ibn Yahya ben Joseph (c. 1515 – c. 1587) (Hebrew: גדליה בן יוסף אבן יחייא), a talmudist born at Imola
 Luca Ghini, scientist of the 16th century who founded the first botanical garden (Orto botanico) at the University of Pisa and the Bologna.
 Giuseppe Scarabelli, 19th century geologist, palaeontologist and politician
 Vincenzo Dal Prato, castrato singer, for whom the role of Idamante was written by Mozart
 Cosimo Morelli, the architect who designed the sacristy of St. Peter's, Rome
 Innocenzo di Pietro Francucci da Imola, painter, a pupil of Francia and Gaspare Sacchi, distinguished painters, nicknamed after his birthplace
 Saint Hippolytus of Rome, author
 According to tradition, Saint Cassian of Imola was a teacher and martyr there during the reign of Emperor Julian the Apostate in the 4th century.
 Saint Peter Chrysologus, who was a deacon there
 Andrea Costa, politician, considered to be among the founders of the Italian Socialist Party.
 Fausto Gresini, who ran a successful MotoGP team
Stefano Domenicali, former Team Principal of Ferrari Formula One Racing Team and current CEO of the Formula One Group.
Quinto Cenni, painter and illustrator
Cincinnato Baruzzi, sculptor

Medals and awards 
 On 12 June 1984, Imola was awarded the Medaglia d'Oro al Valor Militare (Gold Purple Heart) for the role of the city in the Italian resistance movement
 On 2 June 1971, the city was awarded the Medaglia d'oro ai benemeriti della scuola della cultura e dell'arte (Gold Merit Badge of the Art and Culture School).

Twin towns – sister cities

Imola is twinned with:
 Colchester, England, United Kingdom
 Gennevilliers, France
 Piła, Poland
 Pula, Croatia
 Weinheim, Germany
 Zalău, Romania

See also 
Bishopric of Imola

Notes

Sources

External links 

 Accademia Pianistica Internazionale
 WorldStatesmen- Italian early states A-N, listing the lords

 
Cities and towns in Emilia-Romagna
80s BC establishments
Populated places established in the 1st century BC